Trochlea (Latin for pulley) is a term in anatomy. It refers to a grooved structure reminiscent of a pulley's wheel.

Related to joints
Most commonly, trochleae bear the articular surface of saddle and other joints:
 Trochlea of humerus (part of the elbow hinge joint with the ulna)
 Trochlea of femur (forming the knee hinge joint with the patella)
 The trochlea tali in the superior surface of the body of talus (part of the ankle hinge joint with the tibia)
 Trochlear process of the calcaneus
 In quadrupeds, the trochlea of Radius (bone)
 The "knuckles" of the tarsometatarsus which articulate with the proximal phalanges in a bird's foot

Related to muscles
It also can refer to structures which serve as a guide for muscles:
 Trochlea of superior oblique (see also superior oblique muscle), a mover of the eye which is supplied by the trochlear nerve, or fourth cranial nerve